Northeast Party House is an Australian electronic band formed in Melbourne in 2009. The band's six members are Jack Shoe (guitar), Malcolm Besley (drums), Sean Kenihan (synth), Zach Hamilton-Reeves (vocals), Mitch Ansell (guitar) and Oliver Packard (bass).

Musical career

2011–2016: Career beginnings and Any Given Weekend 
In early 2010 Northeast Party House began playing warehouse parties and local venues and quickly gained a following based on their reputation for delivering high energy live shows.

A demo version of the band's track 'Dusk' gained local airplay, eventually winning Triple J's Unearthed competition and being invited to play at the Pyramid Rock Festival 2010.

In 2011 the band played alongside acts such as Does It Offend You, Yeah? (UK), The Go! Team (UK), Kimbra and Ball Park Music as well as finishing the year with a stand out set at Falls Festival.

The group released their debut self titled EP through Stop Start/EMI in November 2011, featuring four tracks including single "Empires".

In 2014 Northeast Party House released their debut record Any Given Weekend which also led to their international debut performing shows in Los Angeles as part of Culture Collide Festival and New York at CMJ Music Marathon.

2016–2021: Dare and Shelf Life 
Early 2016 saw the band complete the writing and recording for album number two – titled Dare. Dares recording was split across Melbourne and London while the band was touring the UK and Europe in May, where they also played The Great Escape Festival and Dot to Dot Festival. The self-produced Dare was mixed and mastered by in house drummer Malcolm Besley. The album was preceded by single "For You". "For You" was certified Gold in Australia by the Australian Recording Industry Association (ARIA) in 2021.

In 2017, North East Party House covered Childish Gambino's Redbone for Triple J's Like a Version.

In February 2020, the band released their third studio album, Shelf Life via Sony Music Australia.

2022: "Cranky Boy"
On 5 August 2022, Northeast Party House released "Cranky Boy".

Tours and festivals
 Headline 'Kick Ons' Tour (2014)
 Headline 'Double Darts' Tour (2015)
 Headline 'Later Straya' Tour (2015)
 Headline US, EU, UK Tour (2015)
 Headline 'Dare' Tour (2016)
 Darwin Festival (2016)
 Headline 'Calypso Beach' Tour (2017)
 The Hills Are Alive Festival (2017)
 Groovin' the Moo (2017)
 Snowtunes (2017)
 Yours and Owls (2017)
 Big Pineapple Music Festival (2018)

Discography

Studio albums

Extended plays

Singles

Award and nominations

ARIA Music Awards
The ARIA Music Awards is an annual awards ceremony that recognises excellence, innovation, and achievement across all genres of Australian music.

|-
| 2020  
| Shelf Life
| ARIA Award for Best Dance Release 
| 
|-

References

External links
 

2009 establishments in Australia
Australian dance music groups
Musical groups established in 2009
Sony Music Australia artists